Trainwreck is a Bangladeshi heavy metal band, founded in 2007.

History 
The band were formed in Dhaka, Bangladesh in 2007, though started actively performing shows from 2009 onwards. In 2019, Trainwreck won Bangalore Open Air 2019 out of 77 bands, and were awarded a slot at Wacken Open Air in Germany later that year. The band would also win the Global Metal Apocalypse award later on in 2019 also. In 2020, the band released their fourth single, and have plans to extend touring.

Band members
Abir Ahmed Shuvo - vocals
A K Rahul - guitar
Ekram Wasi - guitar
Habibullah Farhan - bass
Minhaj Ahmed Mridul - drums

External links

References 

Bangladeshi heavy metal musical groups
Musical groups established in 2007